Kody Swanson (born March 3, 1988) is an American professional sprint car racing driver. He is a seven-time USAC USAC Silver Crown Series champion in 2014, 2015, 2017, 2018, 2019, 2021 and 2022, plus a three-time Little 500 winner. Swanson is currently the all-time wins leader in Silver Crown with 37.

Racing career

Silver Crown Series

Swanson made his Silver Crown Series debut in August 2008. His first series podium came in July 2009 with a third-place finish at Iowa Speedway, driving the No. 19 for Team Six-R. In his sophomore season, he finished fifth in the series standings and was named Rookie of the Year.

His first win came in the Ted Horn 100 at the DuQuoin State Fairgrounds Racetrack in September 2010. It was his only win that season. However, he claimed four podiums and six top-five finishes throughout nine races.

In 2018, Swanson joined Al Unser Sr. as one of the only two drivers in history to win four consecutive Hoosier Hundred USAC Silver Crown Series races at the Indiana State Fairgrounds Speedway in Indianapolis, Indiana. As of the end of the 2021 season, he was the all-time winningest USAC Silver Crown driver with 34 wins (second most is Jack Hewitt).

Little 500
Swanson has competed in the Little 500 at Anderson Speedway five times since 2015. In that time, he has recorded three wins, one each in 2016, 2018, and 2019. 

In 2022, Swanson won the inaugural season of the Indiana-based 500 Sprint Car Tour.

Stock car racing
Swanson watched Automobile Racing Club of America (ARCA) races during combined events with Silver Crown. Silver Crown director Andy Hillenburg, a longtime ARCA team owner and former ARCA champion, arranged a meeting between Swanson and several owners to try to get him an ARCA ride, and this led to a one-race deal in the No. 22 Chad Bryant Racing at Iowa Speedway in July 2020.

Other racing
Swanson has won in USAC National midget cars. In 2020, he tested an Indy Pro 2000 car at La Crosse Fairgrounds Speedway with hopes that he might someday be considered for an Indianapolis 500 ride. Later that year, he would enter the Indy Pro 2000 race at the Carb Night Classic with Legacy Autosport and win in his series debut. 2021 brought Kody the AJ Foyt trophy while becoming only the second driver (Mike Bliss 93/94)  to win in Midgets, Sprint Cars and Silver Crown competition at Indianapolis Raceway Park all in the same year.

Motorsports career results

ARCA Menards Series
(key) (Bold – Pole position awarded by qualifying time. Italics – Pole position earned by points standings or practice time. * – Most laps led.)

Little 500
(key)

American open–wheel racing results

Indy Pro 2000 Championship

Superstar Racing Experience
(key) * – Most laps led. 1 – Heat 1 winner. 2 – Heat 2 winner.

 Season still in progress

References

External links
 
 

1988 births
Living people
NASCAR drivers
ARCA Menards Series drivers
Indy Pro 2000 Championship drivers
People from Kingsburg, California
Racing drivers from California
USAC Silver Crown Series drivers